Aphomia unicolor is a species of snout moth in the genus Aphomia. It was described by Otto Staudinger in 1879 and is known from Greece, Spain, Algeria and Asia Minor.

References

External links
lepiforum.de

Moths described in 1879
Tirathabini
Moths of Europe
Moths of Asia
Moths of Africa